Philo  was a peer-reviewed academic journal published by the Society of Humanist Philosophers from 1998 to 2014. While it has now ceased publication, it was published at the Center for Inquiry with assistance from Purdue University. It focused on the discussion of philosophical issues from an explicitly naturalist perspective. The journal published articles, critical discussions, review essays, and book reviews in all fields of  philosophy, and particularly invited work on the philosophical credentials of both naturalism and various supernaturalist alternatives to naturalism. Electronic access to the journal is  provided by the Philosophy Documentation Center.

See also 
 List of philosophy journals

External links  

Center for Inquiry

Biannual journals
English-language journals
Philosophy journals
Publications established in 1998
Social philosophy journals
Philosophy Documentation Center academic journals